Seamus Kennedy (born 13 May 1949) is an Irish singer, comedian and writer.

Life
Kennedy has entertained audiences in the United States since the 1970s. He was voted Best Irish/Celtic Male Vocalist 1993-2006 by the Washington Area Music Association.

Discography
 Live! (Gransha Records, 1993)
 In Concert (Gransha Records, 1995)
 Goodwill to Men (Gransha Records, 1996)
 Let the Music Take You Home (Gransha Records, 1998)
 Bar Rooms and Ballads (Gransha Records, 2000)
 Gets on Everybody's Nerves (Gransha Records, 2000)
 Favorite Selections (Gransha Records, 2000)
 A Smile and a Tear (Gransha Records, 2001)
 On The Rocks (Gransha Records, 2004)
 By Popular Demand (Gransha Records, 2005)
 Party Pieces (Gransha Records, 2005)
 Sailing Ships and Sailing Men (Gransha Records, 2008)
 Sidekicks and Sagebrush (Gransha Records, 2009)
 Tricky Tongue Twisters (Gransha Records, 2013)

Writings
Clean Cabbage in the Bucket (And Other Tales From The Irish Music Trenches), co-written with Robbie O'Connell, Dennis O'Rourke, Harry O'Donoghue and Frank Emerson.

References

External links
 

1949 births
Living people
Bodhrán players
Irish male singers
Irish songwriters
Musicians from Belfast